"My Greatest Mistake" is a popular song written in 1940 by Jack Fulton and Jack "Bones" O'Brien.

Comments 
The original piano and vocal score is in E major.  The song was Jack Fulton's first hit. Bregman, Vocco & Conn, Inc., of New York was the publisher.  J. R. Lafleur & Son, Ltd. (Boosey & Hawkes), of London was the sole selling agent for the British Empire, except Canada, Newfoundland, and Australia.  J. Albert & Son of Sydney was the selling agent for Australia.

ASCAP boycott 
"My Greatest Mistake" was one of some 1,250,000 songs under an ASCAP license. In 1940, ASCAP attempted to double its fees to broadcasters for the airing of licensed songs.  For ten months – January 1, 1941, to October 29, 1941 – radio broadcasters, namely NBC and CBS, banned all music licensed by ASCAP. Given the timing of the launch of "My Greatest Mistake," the ASCAP boycott, according to O'Brien, stunted the momentum of the song's rise in popularity for 13 recordings that were released before the boycott.

Selected discography

Pre-ASCAP ban

Post-ASCAP ban

Copyrights

Library holdings

Publisher plates 
 H. 15250

Arrangements 
 Arrangement by Charles E. Hathaway, Jr. (1901–1966)George Manning Swing Band CollectionBox 5/55; No. 353 A, page 13, year 1940Eastman School of Music, University of Rochester

Lyrics

Notes and references

Notes

Recording personnel

Copyrights

References 

1940 songs
American songs
Pop ballads
1940s jazz standards
Pop standards
Jazz compositions in E-flat major
Songs written by Jack Fulton